SuperStar was an Arabic television show based on the popular British show Pop Idol created by Simon Fuller's 19 Entertainment & developed by Fremantle Media. The show unites the Arab community by democratically choosing the next singing sensation.  The show is broadcast worldwide on Future TV, a Lebanese television station. It is also the first Idol franchise to feature contestants from multiple countries.

The show was a huge success. Ali Jaber, the executive manager of Future TV, was quoted as saying "This (program) is the most successful for an Arab television.  There isn't a television program that moved the Arab world like that."

However, SuperStar was eclipsed by rival show Star Academy on LBC in the Middle East, in terms of popularity and ratings, after only its first season. It has been surpassed by Star Academy as the number one Arab show, and did not move the Arab world the way it did during the first season.

Future TV subsequently lost the Idol licence to the MBC network, which in 2011 relaunched the programme as Arab Idol on MBC 1.

Summary

SuperStar 1 (2003)
The first ever Arab SuperStar was held between 23 June 2003 and 18 August 2003.
The series was won by the Jordanian Diana Karazon

Participants and date of elimination:
 Diana Karazon - Jordan - Winner
 Rouwaida Attieh - Syria - 18 August 2003
 Melhem Zein - Lebanon - 11 August 2003
 Saoud Abou Sultan UAE - 4 August 2003
 Wael Mansour - Egypt - 28 July 2003
 Shadi Aswad - Syria - 21 July 2003
 Merhi Serhal - Lebanon - 14 July 2003
 Mohammad Lafi - Palestine - 7 July 2003
 Nancy Zabalawi - Syria - 30 June 2003
 Saber Hawari - Algeria - 30 June 2003
 Saad Jamal Al-Dine - Lebanon - 23 June 2003
 Haitham Saeed - Egypt - 23 June 2003

Diana Karazon in World Idol
Diana Karazon participated alongside 10 other Idol winners from other countries in the mini-event World Idol held in London. Diana placed equal in 9th place among the 11 contestants equal with the German SuperStar Alexander Klaws on 45 points. The event was won by the Norwegian Idol Kurt Nilsen.

Diana Karazon performed the first radio single from her CD Super Star El Arab - Ensani Ma Binsak.

Diana Karazon received the following scores respectively:
 United Kingdom awarded 4 points
 Belgium awarded 1 point
 Australia awarded 4 points
 United States awarded 8 points
 Arab world awarded 12 points (default award)
 Poland awarded 1 point
 Netherlands awarded 1 point
 Canada awarded 5 points
 Germany awarded 6 points
 Norway awarded 2 points
 South Africa awarded 1 point

SuperStar 2 (2004)
The second series was held 31 May and 23 August 2004.
Three new audition cities were announced - Tunisia, Bahrain & Paris, France while Algiers was dropped. Tonia Moreeb decided to quit after receiving bad comments about her judging skills in the previous season. She was replaced with music critic/agent Fadia Tanab. An amazing 83 contestants had advanced to the semi finals of Super Star 2, 81 ended up performing before 2 contestants each week would advance to become part of the Top 14 contestants. This series also offered a Wildcard show where it was revealed by the CEO of Future TV - Ali Jaber, that the Top 14 would become a Top 17 & that the Top 5 vote getters in the Wildcards would advance.

Ayman Alatar from Janzour, Libya won the title of Super Star on 23 August 2004, beating runner up Palestinian Ammar Hassan with a weighting of 54% to 46%.

It was revealed later that Ayman had missed the audition in Cairo, Egypt by one day & had one last chance to audition in Damascus, Syria.

Participants and special guests
Participants, their countries and date of elimination
 Ayman Alatar - Libya - Winner
 Ammar Hassan - Palestine - 23 August 2004
 Hadi Aswad - Syria - 16 August 2004
 Ranim Qteit - Egypt - 9 August 2004
 Brigitte Yaghi - Lebanon - 2 August 2004
 Mohannad Mshallah - Syria - 26 July 2004
 Houssam Madanieh - Syria - 19 July 2004
 Abir Nameh - Lebanon - 12 July 2004
 Abd El Rahman Mohamed - Saudi Arabia - 12 July 2004
 Houssam Chami - Lebanon - 28 June 2004
 Mohamed Daoud - Kuwait - 21 June 2004
 Waad Al Bahri - Syria - 14 June 2004
 Mustafa Shwiekh - Egypt - 14 June 2004
 Raneen El Sha'ar - Lebanon - 7 June 2004
 Zahi Saffeyeh - Lebanon - 7 June 2004
 Rania Shaban - UAE - 31 May 2004
 Yasmine El Husaini - Egypt - 31 May 2004

Special guests:
 Wadih El Safi
 Diana Karazon
 Rouwaida Attieh
 Melhem Zein
 Saoud Abou Sultan
 Asalah Nasri
 Nawal El Kuwaiti
 Sherine
 Diana Haddad
 Washeq El Kaman
 Nancy Ajram
 Moeen Charif
 Assi El Helani
 Mari Al Ehram

SuperStar 3 (2005–2006)

The telecast of SuperStar 3 was delayed after the assassination of Future TV founder & Lebanese Prime Minister - Rafik Hariri, as the TV station went into mourning.

SuperStar 3 was the longest Idol production ever with auditions beginning in Cairo on 10 November 2004, with the program culminating on 6 February 2006.

Rania Kurdi did not want to renew her hosting position for Season 3, as a result Heba Sisi was hired for Season 3, but due to the lengthy hiatus over the Hariri murder, her contract prematurely ended before the semi finals had begun, leaving Ayman to host solo for the rest of the season.

Auditions took place in the following cities:
 Beirut, Lebanon
 Damascus, Syria
 Tunis, Tunisia
 Dubai, United Arab Emirates
 Cairo, Egypt
 Amman, Jordan
 Sydney, Australia

Participants and special guests

94 contestants advanced to the theatre round in Beirut. 6 from America, 4 from Australia, 21 from Lebanon, 8 from Egypt, 5 from Jordan, 9 from Syria, 32 from Tunisia & 5 from UAE.

Participants, their countries of origin and date of elimination:
 Ibrahim El Hakami - Saudi Arabia - Winner
 Shahd Barmada - Syria - 6 February 2006
 Ayman Lseeq - Tunisia - 30 January 2006
 Ahmed El Faleh - Iraq - 23 January 2006
 Asma Othmani - Tunisia - 23 January 2006
 Nancy Nasrallah - Lebanon - 9 January 2006
 Haitham El Shoumali - Palestine - 2 January 2006
 Ibrahim Abd El Adheem - Libya - 26 December 2005
 Asma Ben Ahmed - Tunisia - 19 December 2005
 Hatem Adar - Morocco - 19 December 2005
 Samar Andeel - Egypt - 5 December 2005
 Yusra Hamzawi - Tunisia - 28 November 2005

The special guests were:
Once again this season, special musical guests have been invited to the show to offer their support & critiques.

 Ayman El Aatar
 Ammar Hassan
 Hadi Aswad
 Ranim Qteit
 Tony Hana
 Abdallah Al Rowaished
 Walid Toufic
 Marwan Khoury
 Nabil Shaeil
 Lotfi Boushnaq
 Julia Boutros
 Nancy Ajram

The new semi final format from Denmark & America was similarly adopted this season whereby the Top 21 (10 male & 11 female) were placed in male & female groups with 5 contestants advancing to the Top 12.

The semi finalists of Super Star 3 are:
Samar Andeel (Egypt), Aida El Rahbani (Lebanon), Nancy Nasrallah (Lebanon), Rashel El Rasi (Lebanon), Hasna Zlagh (Morocco), Shahd Barmada (Syria), Asma Ben Ahmed (Tunisia), Asma Othmani (Tunisia), Fouzia El Betri (Tunisia), Olfa El Barhoumi (Tunisia), Yusra Hamzawi (Tunisia), Mohamed El Abd (Egypt), Mohamed Jamal (Egypt), Ahmed El Faleh (Iraq), Youssef Kazar (Iraq), Ibrahim Abd El Adheem (Libya), Hatem Adar (Morocco), Haitham El Shoumali (Palestine), Ibrahim El Hakami (Saudi Arabia), Anis Ltaief (Tunisia), Ayman Lseeq (Tunisia)

As of 12 December 2005, the competition of Super Star has been delayed due to the assassination of Lebanese senator Gebran Tueni, the results show scheduled to air on Monday 12 December 2005 will be included with the results due on Monday 19 December 2005.

On 15 January 2006, the competition was once again postponed due to the passing of another key political figure, Jaber Al-Ahmad Al-Jaber Al-Sabah. The performance show was recorded on Tuesday & aired on Thursday 19 January. The votes from this round will be combined with the performance show on 22 January with the elimination of 2 contestants.

On the evening of Monday 6 February 2006, Ibrahim El Hakami from Saudi Arabia became the 3rd Super Star over Shahd Barmada with a 53% to 47% weighting. Along with the title of Super Star, Ibrahim also won a Ford Focus.

Finals elimination chart

SuperStar 4 (2007)
Season 4 of SuperStar was officially confirmed of the season 3 Grand Final.

On 10 April 2006, the following audition cities were revealed on the official Future TV website:
Beirut, Lebanon
Cairo, Egypt
Amman, Jordan
Tunis, Tunisia
Kuwait City, Kuwait
Dubai, United Arab Emirates
Montreal, Quebec, Canada
Los Angeles, USA
Detroit, USA
(São Paulo, Brazil was to be included but scrapped at the last minute)

Auditions took place during September 2006 and the new season premiered on Future TV in late January 2007, one week after the premier of the sixth season of American Idol. The performance show airs on Sunday night with the results show on Monday night.

Participants and special guests

Participants, their countries of origin and date of elimination
 Marwan Ali - Tunisia - Winner
 Saad Lamjarred - Morocco - 4 June 2007
 Yusra Mahnoush - Tunisia - 28 May 2007
 Ahmad Hussein - Lebanon - 14 May 2007
 Rihab Saleh - Egypt - 7 May 2007
 Ibrahim Ashri - Egypt - 30 April 2007
 Fadi Abd El Khaliq - Lebanon - 23 April 2007
 Nesma Kurdi - Egypt - 23 April 2007
 Youssef Bara - Syria - 9 April 2007
 Mustafa Said - Egypt - 2 April 2007
 Rawda Bin Abdallah - Tunisia - 26 March 2007
 Elian Ba'ini - Lebanon - 19 March 2007
 Nada Omar - Egypt - 19 March 2007

Special Guests:
Mayada El Hennawy
Ibrahim El Hakami
Wadih El Safi
Brigitte Yaghi
Hani Shaker
Melhem Zein
Sabah Fakhry
Carole Samaha
Ehab Tawfik
Assi El Helani

Finals elimination chart

On 26 March Rehab Saleh was originally eliminated but brought back by the judges and again eliminated on 7 May.

SuperStar 5 (2008)
Auditions took place in the following cities:
 Beqaa Valley, Lebanon
 Tripoli, Lebanon
 Cairo, Egypt
 Amman, Jordan
 Tunis, Tunisia
 Baghdad, Iraq
 Kuwait City, Kuwait
 Manama, Bahrain
 Casablanca, Morocco

Season 5 kicked off with the first episode on 24 February 2008. There were 3 big changes:
New female judge replacing Fadia who judged the 2nd, 3rd, and 4th season
Wael Mansour (former contestant from SuperStar 2003) & Majdala Khatar now replace Ayman Qaissouni who hosted the first 4 seasons.
Results are no longer given on Mondays, they are on Thursdays giving people 5 days to vote

This year's Top 20 featured 9 females and 11 males. The Top 9 females performed on 6 April and Top 11 males performed on 13 April. 10 were chosen, and 9 of the remaining 10 came back for a Last Chance show on 20 April. One of the girls chose to drop out of the competition but did not state a reason. The Top 12 was completed on 24 April.

Future Television was forced into closing on 9 May, during the 2008 Lebanon conflict. After moving its broadcasting headquarters, the station was back on the air on 13 May at 4:30 p.m (Lebanese Local Time)

Participants and special guests
Names of contestants, their countries of origin and date of elimination:

 Elie Bitar - Lebanon - Winner
 Abdel Majid Ibrahim Saudi Arabia - 24 July 2008
 Mourad El Souiti - Palestine - 17 July 2008
 Asma El Jabri - Morocco - 10 July 2008
 Diana Sharaneq - Lebanon - 10 July 2008
 Dounia Lotfi - Morocco - 26 June 2008
 Aidross El Aidross - Saudi Arabia - 19 June 2008
 Housam Tershishi - Lebanon - 12 June 2008
 Omayma Taleb - Tunisia - 5 June 2008
 Anoushka Mousa - Egypt - 29 May 2008
 Mohamad El Jafeel - Lebanon - 8 May 2008
 Abbas Ali - Iraq - 1 May 2008

Special Guests:
Top 11: Layla Ghoufran
Top 10: Jad Nakhle
Top 9: Hisham Abbas
Top 8: Rouwaida Attieh
Top 7: Nabil Shaeil
Top 6: Walid Toufic
Top 5:Majid Al Mohandis
Top 4:Abdel Rabb Idris
Top 3: Moeen Charif
Top 2: Ragheb Alama

Finals elimination chart

On 3 July Diana Sharaneq was originally eliminated but brought back by the judges and again eliminated the next week.

References

External links
SuperStar Official website

 
Lebanese television series
Television series by Fremantle (company)
2003 Lebanese television series debuts
2008 Lebanese television series endings
2000s Lebanese television series
Non-British television series based on British television series
Future TV original programming